
Otto Hoffmann von Waldau (7 July 1898 – 17 May 1943) was a German general during World War II who commanded the 10th Air Corps. He was killed in an air crash on 17 May 1943.

Awards
 Iron Cross (1914) 2nd and 1st Class
 Clasp to Iron Cross (1939) 2nd and 1st Class
 Knight's Cross of the Iron Cross on 28 June 1942 as Generalleutnant and Fliegerführer Afrika

References

Citations

Bibliography

 

Luftwaffe pilots
1898 births
1943 deaths
People from Kluczbork
Recipients of the Order of the Cross of Liberty, 1st Class
Recipients of the Knight's Cross of the Iron Cross
Prussian Army personnel
People from the Province of Silesia
Luftwaffe World War II generals
Reichswehr personnel
Victims of aviation accidents or incidents in Bulgaria
Generals of Aviators
Victims of aviation accidents or incidents in 1943